Anupama Gowda is an Indian actress who works in Kannada-language films and television shows.

Career 
Gowda started her career as a child artist with Lankesh Patrike in 2003. She made her television debut with the reality show Halli Duniya before playing one of the leads in Nagaari (2015), but the film was unnoticed at the box office. In late 2017, she came into the limelight after participating in the fifth season of Big Boss Kannada. She debuted as an anchor for the television show Kannada Kogile. She starred in the soap opera Chi Sou Savitri before playing dual roles in the television series Akka. In 2018, she starred in Aa Karaala Ratri with Karthik Jayaram and was acclaimed for her performance. She played a journalist in Thrayambakam (2019) starring Raghavendra Rajkumar and RJ Rohit. She hosted the Kannada-language awards for the 8th South Indian International Movie Awards with actor Vijay Raghavendra. She also worked as an anchor for Majaa Bharatha before leaving the show due to its interference with her film career.

Filmography 
All films are in Kannada.

Television

Awards and nominations

References

External links 

Living people
Indian film actresses
Actresses in Kannada cinema
Actresses in Kannada television
Kannada actresses
21st-century Indian actresses
Actresses from Bangalore
Year of birth missing (living people)